On January 6, 2021, supporters of President Donald Trump attempted to overturn his election loss to Joe Biden by attacking the U.S. Capitol Building, disrupting the joint session of Congress assembled to count electoral votes to formalize Joe Biden's victory. By the end of the month, the Federal Bureau of Investigation (FBI) had opened more than 400 case files and issued more than 500 subpoenas and search warrants related to the riot. The FBI also created a website to solicit tips from the public specifically related to the riot and were especially assisted by the crowdsourced sleuthing of a group that calls themselves "Sedition Hunters." By the end of 2021, 725 people had been charged with federal crimes. By the second anniversary of the attack, that number had risen to 978. Those prosecutions are handled by the U.S. Attorney's Office in Washington, D.C.

On January7, 2021, Michael R. Sherwin, the interim United States Attorney for the District of Columbia, said rioters could be charged with seditious conspiracy or insurrection. He further suggested that Trump could be investigated for comments he made to his supporters before they stormed the Capitol and that others who "assisted or facilitated or played some ancillary role" in the events could also be investigated. Early on, the majority of charges filed were for disorderly conduct and unlawful entry, but eventually, some people were charged with seditious conspiracy.

Also on January7, 2021, House Homeland Security Committee Chairman Bennie Thompson said that any rioter who entered the Capitol should be added to the federal No Fly List. Former acting FBI director Andrew McCabe and inspector general David C. Williams argued Trump could face criminal charges for inciting the riot.

Many have been charged with assault on law enforcement officers; "violent entry and disorderly conduct on Capitol ground"; trespassing; disrupting Congress; theft or other property crimes; weapons offenses; making threats; and conspiracy. Some criminal indictments are under seal. The majority of cases are in federal court, while others are in D.C. Superior Court.

Criminal investigations 
Days after the attack, D.C. Attorney General Karl Racine said he was specifically looking at whether to charge Donald Trump Jr., Rudy Giuliani and Mo Brooks with inciting the violent attack on the U.S. Capitol Building, and indicated that he might consider charging Donald Trump when he has left office. Calls for Trump to be prosecuted for inciting the crowd to storm the Capitol Building also were made in the aftermath of the event. D.C. Mayor Muriel Bowser said, "We saw an unprecedented attack on our American democracy incited by the United States president. He must be held accountable. His constant and divisive rhetoric led to the abhorrent actions we saw today." Legal experts have stated that charging Trump with incitement would be difficult under Brandenburg v. Ohio (1969), the Supreme Court ruling which established that for speech to be considered criminally inciting, it must have been intended to incite "imminent lawless action" and "likely to incite or produce such action".

On January7, 2021, Michael Sherwin, interim U.S Attorney for the District of Columbia, expressed willingness to charge any Capitol Police officer found to have assisted the rioters.

On February 10, 2021, CNN reported that the FBI, investigating the death of Brian Sicknick, was in the process of narrowing down a list of potential suspects. On February 26, the agency reportedly identified one suspect of focus, according to sources.

In March 2021, Sherwin said "almost all" of the cases charged in federal court involved "significant federal felonies" with sentences between five and twenty years.

The New York Times reported in March 2021 that the FBI was investigating communications between an unnamed associate of the White House and an unnamed member of Proud Boys during the days prior to the incursion. The communications had been detected by examining cellphone metadata and were separate from previously known contacts between Roger Stone and Proud Boys.

On March 2, 2022, the congressional committee investigating the January 6 attack stated in a court filing that they had enough evidence for "a good-faith basis for concluding that the president and members of his campaign engaged in a criminal conspiracy". In December 2022, the committee recommended President Trump, John Eastman, and potentially others be charged with four types of criminal acts. The congressional committee cannot open criminal investigations, but the Justice Department is investigating Trump and his allies for criminal attempts to overturn the election.

On November 18, 2022, United States Attorney General Merrick Garland named Jack Smith as special counsel to investigate the January 6 attack and Trump's handling of government documents.

Notable sentences 
On March 8, 2022, the first criminal trial involving one of the rioters, Guy Reffitt, ended with a jury conviction. Reffitt was subsequently sentenced to 87 months in federal prison.

On August 11, 2022, Thomas Robertson was sentenced to seven years and three months in prison.

On August 26, 2022, Howard Richardson was sentenced to 46 months in prison followed by three years of supervised release. He had struck a police officer three times with a flagpole, hard enough to break the flagpole. He had been arrested in November 2021 and had pleaded guilty in April 2022.

On September 1, 2022, Thomas Webster was sentenced to 10 years in prison.

On October 27, 2022, Albuquerque Cosper Head was sentenced to seven years and six months (90 months) in prison. He had dragged Metropolitan Police Department officer Mike Fanone into the mob.

On December 5, 2022, Suzanne Ianni was sentenced to 15 days in prison for disorderly conduct. Ianni was formerly an elected member of the town meeting of Natick, Massachusetts, a member of Super Happy Fun America, and organizer of a Boston Straight Pride Parade.

On December 9, 2022, Ronald Sandlin was sentenced to more than five years. Sandlin followed the QAnon ideology. He and two other men had driven from Tennessee to Washington, DC in a rental car filled with weapons, and he had assaulted police officers. He had pled guilty.

On January 6, 2023, Jerod Wade Hughes was sentenced to 46 months. As the eighth rioter to enter the Capitol, he climbed into the building through a broken window and helped kick open the Senate wing door so others could enter. He had pled guilty.

On January 27, 2023, Julian Khater was sentenced to 80 months. He used pepper spray to assault Capitol Police Officer Brian Sicknick, who died the next day after suffering strokes.

On February 9, 2023, Kevin Seefried was sentenced to three years. He carried a Confederate flag through the Capitol and used the flagpole to fend off a police officer.

Investigations into alleged foreign involvement and payments 
On December 8, 2020, French programmer Laurent Bachelier gave around $500,000 in bitcoin payments to alt-right figures and groups. About half of these funds went to Nick Fuentes, the leader of the online Groyper Army, who denied breaching the building. The day after the transfer, Bachelier killed himself. The FBI is investigating whether any of this money financed illegal acts.

The FBI is also investigating whether foreign adversaries of the U.S.governments, organizations or individualsprovided financial support to people who attacked the Capitol.

Separately, a joint threat assessment issued by the FBI, DHS, and other agencies said that "Russian, Iranian, and Chinese influence actors have seized the opportunity to amplify narratives in furtherance of their policy interest amid the presidential transition" and that these governments, through state actors, state media, and their proxies, used the riots to promote violence and extremism in the United States, denigrate American democracy, and in some instance promote conspiratorial claims.

Numbers of people involved 

About 2,000 people "are believed to have been involved with the siege," the FBI told Congress in June 2021.

As of October 2021, approximately 250 people were still wanted for assaulting police officers.

By January 6, 2023, the second anniversary of the attack, at least 978 people had been charged with federal crimes.

Early numbers 
The day after the storming of the Capitol, the FBI and D.C.'s Metropolitan Police Department asked the public for help identifying the rioters. Within three weeks, the FBI had received more than 200,000 digital media tips from the public. At least one person was harassed after being incorrectly identified as a participant in the riots by members of the public. His personal information had been doxed, and he reported receiving harassing phone calls and posts on social media.

In a press conference on January 12, 2021, Steven D'Antuono from the FBI announced the agency's expectation to arrest hundreds of people in the coming months, as it sorts through the vast amount of evidence submitted by the public. The charge brought against most rioters would likely include accusations of sedition and conspiracy.

On January8, 2021, the Justice Department announced charges against 13 people in connection with the Capitol riot in federal district court, while more had been charged in the Superior Court of the District of Columbia. Three days later, the FBI and the Department of Justice were working to track down over 150 suspects. Acting Attorney General Jeffrey A. Rosen instructed federal prosecutors to send all cases back to DC for prosecution.

As of January 13, 2021, over 50 public sector employees and elected officials and over a dozen Capitol police officers were facing internal investigations to determine their possible complicity in the riot.

Demographics 
Many participants were tied to extremist or fringe movements, including the Proud Boys, Oath Keepers, Three Percenters, Patriot Front, Texas Freedom Force, Super Happy Fun America, Woodland Wild Dogs, and America First Bruins. About a third of defendants had ties to such groups, according to a June 2022 estimate.

The majority, however, were not affiliated with a specific far-right group and had been more informally radicalized by right-wing Internet, social media, or television. At least 15% had ties to the military or law enforcement. About 40% were business owners or white-collar workers; only about 9% were unemployed. A Washington Post review of public records showed that of defendants with enough information to identify financial histories, almost 60% had experienced financial problems over the preceding 20 years. Some 18% had a past bankruptcy (nearly double the rate of the general public), 20% had prior eviction and foreclosure proceedings, 25% had been sued by a creditor for not paying money owed; and others had bad debt, delinquent taxes, or tax liens. Many clearly expressed a belief in the QAnon conspiracy theory. While the majority of those charged were men, 25 women were also charged. Among those whose age was known, the average age was 41 years; the youngest charged was 18, and the oldest was 81. Those who were arrested came from 47 states, with the largest numbers coming from Texas, New York, Florida, and Pennsylvania. At least 27 had previous criminal records; with at least nine having been previously accused of, or convicted of, committing violence against women (including one who had served five years in prison for rape and sexual battery), or had been the subject of domestic violence restraining orders.

By the end of February 2021, CNN was aware of "nearly a dozen" defendants who admitted that, to their knowledge, the other Capitol rioters were all Trump supporters and that the riot had not been (as Trump's lawyers and some congressional Republicans had attempted to claim) a left-wing "false-flag" performance to pin blame on Trump supporters. On March 2, FBI Director Chris Wray testified before the Senate Judiciary Committee that there was no evidence that the rioters had been faking their support for Trump.

Arguments raised by defendants
By the end of August, according to CNN's tally, crowdfunding campaigns had raised over $2 million (combined) for the legal defenses of dozens of defendants.

Inspired by Trump 
Within weeks, several defendants had already used the comments of President Trump in their legal defenses. One said, "I feel like I was basically following my president. I was following what we were called to do." A month after the riot, an ABC News investigation found that, of about two hundred accused individuals facing federal charges, at least fifteen had claimed that they acted based on Trump's encouragement. A person who threatened to assassinate Representative Alexandria Ocasio-Cortez during the riot said: "I believed I was following the instructions of former President Trump. I also left Washington and started back to Texas immediately after President Trump asked us to go home." In February 2021, a lawyer for Jacob Angeli told CNN that Trump had inspired the storming of the Capitol using "Trump Talk" and propaganda. Angeli hung on Trump's every word as did millions of other Americans, the lawyer said, adding that Angeli's experience in police custody resembled being deprogrammed from a cult.

In January 2022, The New York Times reported that federal prosecutors were asking defense attorneys of indicted rioters if their clients would admit in sworn statements that they stormed the Capitol believing Trump wanted them to stop Pence from certifying the election. One member of Proud Boys who pleaded guilty said he had conspired with other members to "send a message to legislators and Vice President Pence." Another rioter stated in her guilty plea that she marched on the Capitol specifically after hearing Trump encourage Pence to "do the right thing." In April 2022, a defense lawyer for one of the rioters told jurors that Trump had been "using his position to authorize this assault."

Before their trials, Stewart Rhodes and several Oath Keeper defendants who participated in the insurrection sought to use a "public authority" defense arguing that they should be immune from criminal liability because they relied on Trump's orders. (Such a defense is also called "entrapment-by-estoppel"). U.S. District Judge Amit Mehta, in ruling on pretrial motions, barred the defendants from raising such a defense, noting that Trump had no authority to call the defendants to action on January 6.

Ignorance 
By February 2021, at least 39 criminal defendants claimed in court filings that they believed that they were free to enter the Capitol during the riot, as law enforcement officers did not attempt to stop them from entering and never told them they were not allowed to enter the building.

One defendant, Timothy Hale-Cusanelli (a New Jersey right-wing extremist who had previously dressed as Hitler), was the fifth January 6 defendant to go to a jury trial. He testified in his May 2022 trial that he was an "idiot" who had not known that Congress met at the Capitol, despite having also testified that he was a "history buff" who closely tracked the electoral college process. The jury convicted Hale-Cusanelli on all five counts, and after the verdict was rendered Judge Trevor N. McFadden said he would consider giving a sentencing enhancement to Hale-Cusanelli because of the "highly dubious" nature of his testimony. At the September 2022 sentencing hearing (in which Hale-Cusanelli was sentenced to four years), McFadden said that Hale-Cusanelli had lied under oath, telling him, "You absolutely knew what you and others were doing."

Trump's consideration of presidential pardon
Several, including Jacob Angeli, reportedly hoped for Presidential pardons before Trump left office. During the two weeks following the attack and before he left office, Trump seriously considered a blanket pardon. It was deemed unfeasible because it would apply to a large, undefined group of people, many of whom had not yet been charged nor even identified. Concern was also expressed that White House counsel Pat Cipollone might quit if Trump were to attempt a blanket pardon. On January 29, 2022, when over 760 people had been charged, Trump said at a Texas rally that he would be inclined to pardon the rioters if he were reelected in 2024. He repeated the promise at a Tennessee rally in June 2022. In November, four days before the midterm elections, he said: "Let them all go now!"

Representative Adam Schiff, who serves on the House committee investigating the attack, told MSNBC in February 2022 that Trump's offer of pardons suggests that he "condoned" the violence. Representative Pete Aguilar, who is also on the committee, told CNN the same day that he considers Trump's offer to be witness tampering.

Specific arrests and charges

Seditious conspiracy 
On March 2, 2022, Oath Keeper Joshua James pleaded guilty to seditious conspiracy, admitting in his plea that "from November 2020 through January 2021, he conspired with other Oath Keeper members and affiliates to use force to prevent, hinder and delay the execution of the laws of the United States governing the transfer of presidential power." Stewart Rhodes and Kelly Meggs, also of the Oath Keepers, were found guilty of seditious conspiracy on November 29, 2022.

On June 6, 2022, five members of the Proud Boys—their leader Enrique Tarrio, together with Joseph Biggs, Zachary Rehl, Ethan Nordean and Dominic Pezzola—were indicted for seditious conspiracy.

Other 
A list of Capitol breach cases is being kept updated by the US Attorney's Office, District of Columbia. BuzzFeed has a searchable table of the plea deals.

Most defendants face "two class-B misdemeanor counts for demonstrating in the Capitol and disorderly conduct, and two class-A misdemeanor counts for being in a restricted building and disruptive activity," according to BuzzFeed, and therefore most plea deals address those misdemeanors. Some defendants have been additionally charged with felonies.

By February 1, 2021, 228 people from 39 states and DC had been charged with federal and/or DC offences. By early September, there were over 600 federal defendants, 10% of whom had pled guilty, and hundreds more arrests expected to come. By October 13, there were 100 guilty pleas. By the second anniversary of the attack, nearly 1,000 people had been federally charged.

According to Politico, dozens of defendants "deemed to be dangerous, flight risks or at high risk of obstructing justice were ordered held without bond. D.C. jail officials later determined that all Capitol detainees would be placed in so-called restrictive housing." U.S. Senator Elizabeth Warren criticized this decision, referring to it as solitary confinement, which she argued "is a form of punishment that is cruel and psychologically damaging."

Additional notes 
June 10, 2021 – The Los Angeles FBI Field Office arrested and charged six Southern California individuals in relation to the January 6 riots. Of the six individuals, three of them self-identified in Telegram chats as members of the Three Percenters. They are all charged with multiple felonies, including conspiracy, obstructing an official proceeding, and unlawful entry on restricted building or grounds. One of the charged, the former police chief of the city of La Habra, California, was charged with obstructing law enforcement during a civil disorder and unlawful possession of a dangerous weapon on Capitol grounds. Two members of the Three Percenters were additionally charged with tampering with documents or proceedings related to their deletion of Telegram chats and content to avoid detection by law enforcement. The six men, along with at least thirty others, were part of a private Telegram group which planned to attack the Capitol on January 6 and conspired to bring weapons.
June 11, 2021 – The FBI announced arrests and charges for three people, two from Minnesota and one from Iowa, who participated in the events on Jan 6. A man from Minneapolis, Minnesota, faced charges for his alleged actions of breaking through a police line and assaulting two Capitol police officers. According to his charging documents, the man posted photos of himself on Facebook and made claims that he was "beating up cops" while in Washington, D.C. A man from Austin, Minnesota, and his father, a resident of St. Ansgar, Iowa, were arrested without resistance and face charges related to participating in events inside the Capitol building.
October 4, 2021 – Three men from Lindstrom, Minnesota, were charged with several federal counts for entering the Capitol building and assaulting police officers on January 6. They were among eight people in total from Minnesota charged in connection with the events.
December 9, 2021 – Tam Dinh Pham, an 18-year veteran of the Houston Police Department, is sentenced to 45 days in prison after pleading guilty to petty misdemeanor offense of parading, demonstrating or picketing inside the Capitol Building. Three other criminal charges were dropped by the Department of Justice as part of the plea agreement.

Related activities and proceedings 
On January 12, 2021, a retired Navy SEAL and the director of firearms training business ATG Worldwide, who posted a Facebook video on January6, 2021, in which he described "breaching the Capitol", was questioned by the FBI. On January12, 2021, the ATG Facebook page shared a video message from the man in which he described having participated in a "caravan" to the Capitol on January6, 2021 because he was "angry at the direction of our country." He has expressed regret for his participation and said he is cooperating with the FBI.

On April 28, 2021, a 37-year-old Brooklyn man, Brendan Hunt, was convicted of making a death threat against unspecific congresspeople and senators, in a vlog around the time of the Capitol riots. Although Hunt was not in Washington on January 6, federal prosecutors cited the Capitol riots as relevant context that made such a threat more dangerous.

On October 15, 2021, Capitol Police Officer Michael A. Riley was arrested and charged with obstruction of justice for advising Jacob Hiles to remove incriminating posts from social media. The U.S. Capitol Police disclosed that they had known of the investigation into Riley's actions for several weeks, placed him on administrative suspension upon his arrest, and announced an internal affairs investigation into his actions. Riley's trial began on October 18, 2022. Hiles had previously pleaded guilty to unlawfully protesting in the Capitol. On October 28, 2022, a jury found Riley guilty of one count of obstruction of justice but was unable to reach a decision on a second charge. Riley's attorneys have filed a motion for acquittal and have said they will appeal if the verdict stands.

On March 2, 2022, federal prosecutors presented their opening statements in a criminal trial against Guy Wesley Reffitt. Many other defendants were charged with obstruction related to the disruption of the Electoral College vote certification, but Reffitt's trial was "the first time a jury will get to decide whether the charge fits the crime", according to the New York Times. On March 8, 2022, he was found guilty on all five counts: transporting a firearm in furtherance of a civil disorder; obstruction of an official proceeding; entering or remaining in a restricted area or grounds with a firearm; obstructing officers during a civil disorder; and obstruction of justice — hindering communication through force or threat of physical force. Prosecutors sought a 15-year prison sentence, by far the longest among the over 200 other convicted rioters at that time. On August 1, 2022, he was sentenced to 7 years.

On March 23, 2022, Capitol riot suspect Evan Neumann was granted asylum in Belarus "indefinitely". Neumann claimed that he faced "political persecution" in the United States.

On March 9, 2023, Politico reported that an email showed that an agent from the Justice Department had given an order to “destroy 338 items of evidence.” The same Politico article also said, "Some of the messages appeared to reveal that FBI agents accessed contacts between defendant Zachary Rehl and his attorney."

See also 
 Attempts to overturn the 2020 United States presidential election
 Justice for J6 rally
 Public hearings of the United States House Select Committee on the January 6 Attack
 2023 invasion of the Brazilian Congress, whose events have been likened to the U.S. Capitol attack

References

External links 
 
 

Proceedings surrounding the January 6 United States Capitol attack
January 2021 crimes in the United States
Political crimes